, formerly , was one of Japan's leading music companies. It became a wholly owned subsidiary of British music company EMI Group Ltd. on June 30, 2007, after Toshiba sold off its previous 45% stake. Its CEO and president was Kazuhiko Koike. When EMI Music Japan was trading as Toshiba-EMI, it was involved with the production of anime. On April 1, 2013, the company became defunct, following its absorption into Universal Music Japan as a sublabel under the name EMI Records Japan.

History
From 1962, it licensed Columbia (UK) titles for release in Japan. After an injection of capital by Capitol EMI, EMI acquired 50% of the company in October 1973, and the name was changed to Toshiba EMI Limited. On October 3, 1994, the equity ratio of the company was changed, in which EMI obtained 55% with Toshiba owning the remaining 45%. On June 30, 2007, Toshiba Corporation sold the remaining 45% stake in the company to EMI, giving EMI full ownership of the company. The name was then changed to EMI Music Japan, reflecting Toshiba's divestiture from the business. In 2012, EMI Music Japan and Universal Music Group's Japanese branch was scheduled to hold a corporate swap in response to the merger by January 15, 2013, with Kazuhiko Koike serving as EMIJ's president. On April 1, 2013, EMI Music Japan was officially absorbed into Universal Music Japan, became defunct as a company and has been renamed to EMI Records Japan. The label continued to use the TOCT catalog code until October 2013, when it started to use the TYCT catalog code. The official website has been shut down as of October 23, 2013.

After the dissolution and absorption, some of the former EMI staffs and executives has been into different companies away from Universal Music. Then-executive producer San-e Ichii has been the managing director of Japan Content Expansion Department. Kazuhiko Koike (also former CEO of Universal Music Japan) has stepped down from his position as CEO by the end of 2013, nine months after the merger, and became non-executive chairman by the beginning of 2014. He was replaced by Naoshi Fujikura.

Advertising slogan
EMI Music Japan's present slogan is "Music for all, All for music".

Labels

 Awake Sounds
 EMI Records (Japan)
 Apple Records
 Capitol Records
 Capitol Music (Japan)
 Virgin Records
 Virgin Music (Japan) - not to be confused with Media Remoras, a Pony Canyon label formerly known as "Virgin Japan"
 Eastworld
 Express
 Foozay Music
 i-Dance
 Reservotion Records
 SakuraStar Records
 SoundTown (EMI Strategic Marketing)
 Suite Supuesto!
 TM Factory 
 Unlimited Records

See also
List of record labels
Youmex

References

External links
 —
 50th Anniversary of EMI Music Japan (2010) website—

Japan
Japanese record labels
Defunct record labels of Japan
Record labels established in 1960
Record labels disestablished in 2013
Mass media companies established in 1960
Mass media companies disestablished in 2013
IFPI members
Toshiba
Universal Music Japan
Former Vivendi subsidiaries
Japanese companies established in 1960
Japanese companies disestablished in 2013